Skinner's Bubble is a 1917 American silent comedy film directed by Harry Beaumont and starring Bryant Washburn, Hazel Daly and James C. Carroll. It was created as a sequel to Skinner's Dress Suit.

Cast
 Bryant Washburn as William Manning Skinner
 Hazel Daly as Honey
 James C. Carroll as McLaughlin
 Ullrich Haupt as Perkins
 Marian Skinner as Mrs. McLaughlin

References

Bibliography
 Joel Frykholm. George Kleine and American Cinema: The Movie Business and Film Culture in the Silent Era. Bloomsbury Publishing, 2019.

External links
 

1917 films
1917 comedy films
1910s English-language films
American silent feature films
Silent American comedy films
American black-and-white films
Films directed by Harry Beaumont
Essanay Studios films
1910s American films